Bosea vestrisii is a bacterium from the genus of Bosea which was isolated from hospital water.

References

External links
Type strain of Bosea vestrisii at BacDive -  the Bacterial Diversity Metadatabase

Hyphomicrobiales
Bacteria described in 2003